Annunciation with St John the Baptist and St Andrew is a c.1485 oil-on-panel painting by Filippino Lippi. An early work by the artist, it shows an Annunciation scene between John the Baptist (left, patron saint of Florence) and Andrew (right, with his diagonal cross). 

In the background is a view of Florence, meaning it may have been commissioned for an individual or institution in the city – the view includes Santa Maria del Fiore, Giotto's Campanile, the Bargello and the Badia. The painting is influenced by several other artists, including Lippi's father Filippo (who often painted Annunciations) and Filippino's colleague Botticelli. The detailed and naturalistic flora in the foreground and background is typical of late-15th-century Florentine art, influenced by new works from the Low Countries and studies by Leonardo da Vinci.

It was confiscated from San Luigi dei Francesi in Rome by French Republican troops and in 1801 entered the Galleria Francavilla in Naples. At that time it was attributed to Ghirlandaio. It is now in the Museo nazionale di Capodimonte in Naples.

References

External links

Paintings by Filippino Lippi
Paintings in the collection of the Museo di Capodimonte
Farnese Collection
Paintings depicting the Annunciation
Paintings depicting John the Baptist
Paintings depicting Andrew the Apostle
1485 paintings